Kichikir (Keseqor) is a rural locality (a village) in Starokudashevsky Selsoviet, Yanaulsky District, Bashkortostan, Russia. The population was 96 as of 2010. There are 4 streets.

Geography 
Kichikir is located 20 km southwest of Yanaul (the district's administrative centre) by road. Vedresevo is the nearest rural locality.

References 

Rural localities in Yanaulsky District